Carpenter's Flats Bridge is a historic Warren Steel Truss bridge over the Ausable River at AuSable and Peru in Clinton County, New York. It was built by the American Bridge Company in 1941.

It was listed on the National Register of Historic Places in 1999 for representing the distinctive American bridge designs of the late 19th and early 20th centuries and reflecting the development of American land-based transportation systems in an era of settlement.

References

Road bridges on the National Register of Historic Places in New York (state)
Bridges completed in 1941
Bridges in Clinton County, New York
National Register of Historic Places in Clinton County, New York
Steel bridges in the United States
Warren truss bridges in the United States